The following, is the list of subcamps of the Ravensbrück concentration camp complex built and run by Nazi Germany during World War II. By 1944 Ravensbrück consisted of a system of between 31, and 40, and up to 70 subcamps, spread out from Austria to the Baltic Sea, with over 70,000 predominantly female prisoners. It was the only major Nazi camp for women.

Selected locations and firms
 Altdorf Lake, for Heinkel-Flugzeugwerke
 Altenburg (over 1,000 prisoners; became a subcamp of Buchenwald in 1944)
 Ansbach
 Barth (over 1,000 prisoners), for Heinkel-Flugzeugwerke
 Belzig (became a subcamp of Sachsenhausen in 1944), for Kopp and Co.
 Berlin (over ten camps)
 Born
 Dabelow
 Dahmshöhe
 Dresden Universelle
 Eberswalde
 Feldberg (Mecklenburg)
 Fürstenberg/Havel
 Genthin (became a subcamp of Sachsenhausen in 1944)
 Grüneberg (at Löwenberger Land; over 1,000 prisoners, up to 1,710) for Metall-Poltekonzern, Munitionsfabrik 
 Gut Hartzwalde
 Hagenow
 Hausham (became a subcamp of Dachau in 1944)
 Helmbrechts (became a subcamp of Flossenbürg in 1944)
 Hennigsdorf
 Hohenlychen
 Holýšov (became a subcamp of Flossenbürg)
 Kalisz Pomorski
 Karlshagen (over 1,000 prisoners) 
 Klützow
 Königsberg in der Neumark (in Chojna) for Flughafen GmbH
 Kraslice (became a subcamp of Flossenbürg in 1944)
 Leipzig-Schönefeld (over 1,000 prisoners; became a subcamp of Buchenwald in 1944)
 Magdeburg (over 1,000 prisoners; became a subcamp of Buchenwald in 1944)
 Malchow (over 1,000 prisoners, up to 4,196) 
 Mildenburg
 Munich, for Lebensborn e.V.
 Neubrandenburg (over 1,000 prisoners, up to 4,343)
 Neustadt-Glewe (over 1,000 prisoners, up to 4,220)
 Nová Role (became a subcamp of Flossenbürg in 1944)
 Peenemünde
 Prenzlau
 Rechlin
 Retzow
 Rostock, for Heinkel-Flugzeugwerke 
 Rostock-Marienehe
 Rostock-Schwarzenforst 
 Sassnitz
 Schlieben (became a subcamp of Buchenwald in 1944)
 Schoenefeld, Krs. Teltow (later became a subcamp of Sachsenhausen)
 Security Police School Drögen (was a subcamp of Sachsenhausen until 1942)
 Stargard (in Stargard Szczeciński), for Gerätewerk Pommern GmbH
 Steinhöring
 Svatava (became a subcamp of Flossenbürg in 1944)
 Uckermark
 Velten (became a subcamp of Sachsenhausen in 1944)
 Wiesbaden
 Wolfen (became a subcamp of Buchenwald in 1944)
 Zichow

See also
 List of Nazi concentration camps

Notes and references

 
Ravensbruck
Subcamps of Nazi concentration camps